Vanda Juknaitė (born 28 November 1949) is a Lithuanian writer, playwright and essayist.

Biography
Juknaitė was born in Papiliai in the Rokiškis District Municipality of northeastern Lithuania. After studying Lithuanian language and literature at Vilnius University, she taught first at the Klaipeda Conservatory and, from 1975, at the University of Educational Science. She has worked in the area of social pedagogy dealing with homeless, disabled and street children.

Her first book Ugniaspalvė lapė (The Red Fox) was published in 1983. One of her more notable works, the memoir Išsiduosi. Balsu: esė, pokalbiai, published in Lithuania in 2002 was translated into English by Laima Sruoginis as My Voice Betrays Me. It presents the joys and difficulties of Lithuania's transition from communism to democracy. Another work of note is Šermenys (1990), a novel describing the mass deportations of men to Siberia leaving the women to safeguard Lithuanian society.

In 2008, she received the Lithuanian National Prize for her achievements in art and culture and for supporting international understanding of Lithuanian culture.

Works
 Ugniaspalvė lapė, novella and short stories – Vilnius: Vaga, 1983
 Šermenys, novel – Vilnius: Vaga, 1990
 Stiklo šalis, story – Vilnius: Lietuvos rašytojų sąjungos leidykla, 1995; Alma littera, 2012
 Šermenys, drama – Vilnius: Alma littera, 2000, 2001
 Išsiduosi, essays, interviews – Vilnius: Lietuvos rašytojų sąjungos leidykla, 2002
 Saulėlydžio senis: Romualdo Granausko, creative interpretations / together with Elena Nijole Bukeliene. – Vilnius: Alma littera, 2004
 Tariamas iš tamsos, interviews with children – Vilnius: Lietuvos rašytojų sąjungos leidykla, 2007, 2012
 Ponios Alisos gimtadienis, two plays – Vilnius: Lietuvos rašytojų sąjungos leidykla, 2010

In English

References

1949 births
Living people
Lithuanian novelists
Lithuanian women novelists
Lithuanian women essayists
Lithuanian essayists
People from Rokiškis District Municipality
20th-century novelists
Women memoirists
20th-century essayists
21st-century essayists
20th-century Lithuanian women writers
20th-century Lithuanian writers
21st-century Lithuanian women writers
21st-century Lithuanian writers